The Diocese of Rockford is a Latin Church ecclesiastical territory, or diocese, of the Catholic Church in the northern Illinois region of the United States.  The prelate is a bishop serving as the pastor of the Mother Church, the Cathedral of Saint Peter in the City of Rockford. Pope Benedict XVI appointed David Malloy, as the ninth and current bishop on March 20, 2012.  He was installed on May 14, 2012. A suffragan diocese of the Province of Chicago, the metropolitan bishop of Rockford is the Archbishop of Chicago.

Territory 
The Diocese of Rockford comprises the counties of Boone, Carroll, DeKalb, Jo Daviess, Kane, Lee, McHenry, Ogle, Stephenson, Whiteside and Winnebago.

History

Early history 
During the 17th century, present day Illinois was part of the French colony of New France. The Diocese of Quebec, which had jurisdiction over the colony, sent numerous French missionaries to the region. After the British took control of New France in 1763, the Archdiocese of Quebec retained jurisdiction in the Illinois area. In 1776, the new United States claimed sovereignty over the area of Illinois. In 1785, Archbishop John Carroll of the Archdiocese of Baltimore, then having jurisdiction over the entire United States, sent his first missionary to Illinois. In 1787, the area became part of the Northwest Territory of the United States.

With the creation of the Diocese of Bardstown in Kentucky in 1810, supervision of the Illinois missions shifted there. In 1827, the new bishop of the Diocese of St. Louis assumed jurisdiction in the new state of Illinois. In 1834, the Vatican erected the Diocese of Vincennes, which included both Indiana and Illinois. With the creation of the Diocese of Chicago in 1843, all of Illinois was transferred there from the Diocese of Vincennes.

Diocese of Rockford 
Pope Pius X erected the Diocese of Rockford on September 27, 1907, and established it on September 23, 1908.  Its territory of 12 counties was taken from the Archdiocese of Chicago. The pope appointed Auxiliary Bishop Peter Muldoon of the Archdiocese of Chicago as the first bishop of Rockford. With the 1917 entry of the United States into World War I, Muldoon ministered to soldiers and recruits at Camp Grant, the US Army facility in Rockford.   He died in 1927.

Auxiliary Bishop Edward Hoban of the Archdiocese of Chicago was named by Pope Pius XI in 1928 as bishop of Rockford. During his tenure, Hoban opened many elementary and high schools in the diocese, modernized charitable institutions, and established a diocesan newspaper. in 1942, Pope Pius XII appointed Hoban as coadjutor bishop for the Diocese of Cleveland.

The next bishop of Rockford was Reverend John Boylan, appointed by Pius XII in 1942. During his tenure as bishop, Boylan was able to reduce the diocese's debt while adding new parishes and schools to meet population growth.In 1948, Pope Pius XII established the Diocese of Joliet and transferred Kendall County, Illinois, from Rockford to Joliet.  After Boylan died in 1953, Pius XII named Reverend Raymond Hillinger to replace him that same year. Three years later, Pius XII appointed Hillinger as an auxiliary bishop in Chicago.

Auxiliary Bishop Loras Lane from the Archdiocese of Dubuque replaced Hillinger in 1956, appointed by Pius XII. Lane died in 1968, leaving Pope Paul VI to name Reverend Arthur O'Neill from the Diocese of Providence to take Lane's place.  Bishop of Rockford for 26 years, O'Neill retired in 1994. Pope John Paul II made Reverend Thomas G. Doran the next bishop of Rockford. Doran retired in 2012.

The current bishop of Rockford is David Malloy, appointed by Pope Benedict XVI in 2012.

Sexual abuse 
In May 2002, Bishop Doran confirmed that Harlan Clapsaddle, a diocese priest, had sexually abused three brothers when they were children during the 1970s.  When the boys complained in 1996 to the diocese, it removed Clapsaddle immediately after an investigation.  The family said they urged Doran at that time to report Clapsaddle to the police and search for other victims, but he instead told them to stay silent about it.  The brothers each received a $27,000 cash settlement in 1997.

On November 15, 2018, Bishop Malloy released a list of clerics from the diocese who had been accused of acts of sexual abuse from 1925 to 1991.  In March 2019, Malloy revoked the priestly faculties of Joseph Jablonski, a priest of the Missionaries of the Sacred Heart.  While ministering in the Diocese of San Bernardino in California in 2014, Jablonski allegedly made remarks to a young boy that constituted sexual grooming.  The Diocese of San Bernardino immediately reported him to authorities and banned him from ministering in its parishes.  When Jablonski moved to the Archdiocese of Chicago, the Missionaries did not notify the archdiocese about his record in California.

Bishops

Bishops of Rockford
 Peter Muldoon (1908-1927)
 Edward Francis Hoban (1928-1942), appointed Coadjutor Bishop and later Bishop of Cleveland
 John Joseph Boylan (1942-1953)
 Raymond Peter Hillinger (1953-1956), appointed Auxiliary Bishop of Chicago
 Loras Thomas Lane (1956-1968)
 Arthur Joseph O'Neill (1968-1994)
 Thomas George Doran (1994-2012)
 David John Malloy (2012–present)

Other priests of this diocese who became bishops
 Leo Binz, appointed Coadjutor Bishop in 1942 and later Bishop of Winona, Coadjutor Archbishop and later Archbishop of Dubuque, and Archbishop of Saint Paul and Minneapolis
 Timothy Lawrence Doherty, appointed Bishop of Lafayette in Indiana in 2010
 David Kagan, appointed Bishop of Bismarck in 2011

High schools
 Aquin Catholic Schools (Junior-Senior High Campus), Freeport
 Aurora Central Catholic High School, Aurora
 Boylan Catholic High School, Rockford
 Marian Central Catholic High School, Woodstock
 Marmion Academy, Aurora
 Newman Central Catholic High School, Sterling
 Rosary High School, Aurora
 St. Edward Central Catholic High School, Elgin

Notes

References

External links 
 Roman Catholic Diocese of Rockford Official Site
 Catholic Hierarchy 

 
Rockford
Christian organizations established in 1908
Rockford
1908 establishments in Illinois